Choir of the Mind is the second studio album by Canadian singer/songwriter Emily Haines & the Soft Skeleton. Her first solo album in 11 years, it was released on September 5, 2017 by Last Gang Records and elicited favorable reviews from critics. The album peaked in the top 20 of the American Heatseekers Albums chart, and also debuted in the top 50 on the Canadian Albums Chart and the American Independent Albums chart.

Composition
Many of the lyrics on the album center on feminism. In an interview with Billboard, Haines responded to journalists' claims that the album is about "a woman's place in the world" by stating that: "I’m going to resist the word 'about' because its not like a record about women’s place in the world at all [...] I’m really interested in the idea of femininity as a free-standing life force, and not always constructed in relation to what it isn’t, or in opposition to masculinity, or some sort of implied animosity between the sexes or something."

Release
The album was released on September 5, 2017 by Last Gang Records. It was her first solo album in 11 years; however, in that time she had released three albums as part of the indie rock group Metric, in addition to contributing to two Broken Social Scene records.

Critical reception

Upon its release, the album was met with generally favorable reviews from music critics. It holds a score of 75/100 on review aggregate site Metacritic, indicating "generally favorable reviews," based on 11 reviews. Tim Sendra, writing for AllMusic, awarded the album 4 stars out of 5, praising her vocals as possessing an "understated power and graceful beauty," singling out the album's ballads as highlights and deemed the album "richly melodic, subtly dynamic, and emotionally powerful." Exclaim! awarded the album a score of 8/10 and praised "Legend of the Wild Horse" as "a quietly powerful rock ballad," concluding that the album was worth the 11-year wait.

Track listing
Adapted from AllMusic.

Credits
Adapted from AllMusic.
Justin Broadbent — artwork and photography
Phil Demetro — mastering
Emily Haines — vocals, production
Kenny Luono — engineering
Jimmy Shaw — mixing, production

Charts

References

2017 albums
Emily Haines albums